Jungshahi Railway Station is a railway station located in Jungshahi, Thatta district of Sindh province, Pakistan.

Services
The following trains stop at Jungshahi station:

See also
 List of railway stations in Pakistan
 Pakistan Railways

References

External links

Railway stations in Thatta District
Railway stations on Karachi–Peshawar Line (ML 1)